Lalit Mohan Suklabaidya (born 1 December 1942)  in Karimganj, Assam, India, is an Indian politician who was a Member of Parliament from Lok Sabha. He represented the Karimganj constituency in Assam from 2004 to 2014 and is a member of the Indian National Congress.

Background

 Lalit Mohan Suklabaidya was educated at the University of Guwahati and graduated with a MA degree in economics. He is married to Sandhya Suklabaidya and is father to two children. Lalit Mohan Suklabaidya has 3 Grandchildren   

Suklabaidya taught at the Silchar Polytechnic and National Defence Academy. He retired as Joint Director of Higher Education of Assam.

Political career
Suklabaidya has served three terms as a Member of Parliament (MP) from the Lok Sabha. He was elected from Karimganj in 2004 and was re-elected in 2009. Suklabaidya is a member of the Indian National Congress.

References

1942 births
Indian National Congress politicians
Living people
India MPs 2004–2009
People from Karimganj district
India MPs 2009–2014
Lok Sabha members from Assam
United Progressive Alliance candidates in the 2014 Indian general election
Indian National Congress politicians from Assam